A hybrid striped bass, also known as a wiper or whiterock bass, is a hybrid between the striped bass (Morone saxatilis) and the white bass (M. chrysops).  It can be distinguished from the striped bass by broken rather than solid horizontal stripes on the body. Hybrid striped bass are considered better suited for culture in ponds than either parent species because they are more resilient to extremes of temperature and to low dissolved oxygen.

They became part of aquaculture in the United States in the late 1980s. Most producers purchase the fish young (as fry or fingerlings) and raise them in freshwater ponds. Currently, about 10 million lb (4.5 million kg) are produced annually in the United States. Hybrid striped bass are used both as a gamefish and a food fish.

Hybrid striped bass are produced two different ways. Some of these fish are produced by fertilizing eggs from white bass with sperm from striped bass; the resulting fish are also called "sunshine bass" or "Cherokee bass". Others are produced by fertilizing eggs from striped bass with sperm from white bass; the resulting fish is called a "palmetto bass".

Hybrid striped bass are known for aggressive feeding habits which makes them highly sought-after by anglers.  Often schooling by the thousands, these stocked fish surface feed on baitfish such as shad.  Often called "breaking", this surface feeding makes the fish visible and easy to catch on a wide array of lures and baits.  Popular lures include casting spoons, buck-tail jigs, soft-body plastic fish replicas, and inline spinners.

Their quality as a hard-fighting gamefish is closely followed by their delicious firm, white, flaky meat.  Many restaurants sell "striped bass" on their menus, but these are farm-raised hybrid striped bass.

Origins
Origins are from 1970s, when the first hybrids were stocked in Cherokee Lake in Tennessee.  They became known as Cherokee bass, but most commonly are called 'hybrid' (Southeast) or 'wiper' (Midwest).  They are stocked in dozens of large impoundments to control baitfish populations and provide sport for anglers.

Production
Produced in hatcheries, the most common hybridization is the female striped bass Morone saxatilis and the male white bass M. chrysops.  This is due to the high number of eggs produced by the female striped bass.  This hybrid cross, palmetto bass, typically produces a faster-growing offspring which attains larger size than the sunshine bass.  The female striped bass is injected with human gonadotropin which stimulates her to lay.  Usually, around a dozen male white bass are in the tank when the spawn occurs.  Once the eggs are fertilized, the brood fish are removed and the eggs must stay adrift in artificial current for about 48 hours to hatch.  Natural hybridization occurs between the species, but it is usually the reverse cross which would be male M. saxatilis x female M. chrysops, since the white bass eggs do not require the same degree of flotation to hatch.

Their main diet includes shad, bluegill, sunfish, fathead minnows, and black and white crappie.

References
 
 
 
 

Morone
Fish hybrids